Ben Holmes (November 6, 1890 – December 2, 1943) was an American film director and screenwriter. He directed 56 films and wrote for 35.

Selected filmography
 So This Is Harris! (1933)
 Too Many Wives (1937); directed
 There Goes My Girl (1937); directed
 The Saint in New York (1938); directed
 Maid's Night Out (1938); directed
 The Saint's Double Trouble (1940)

References

External links

1890 births
1943 deaths
American male screenwriters
Writers from Richmond, Virginia
Film directors from Virginia
Screenwriters from Virginia
20th-century American male writers
20th-century American screenwriters